Adel Amrouche (born 7 March 1968) is an Belgo-Algerian football manager and former player who manages the Yemen national team. Following the part of his career in Belgium, where he clinched his UEFA trainer-licence, Amrouche also hold a Belgian passeport.

Club career
Amrouche began his playing in the junior ranks of CA Kouba. He played for a number of Algerian clubs including CR Belouizdad, USM Alger, JS Kabylie, OMR El Annasser, Olympique de Médéa and AS Ain M'lila. He then moved to Austria briefly to play for Favoritner AC. After that, he played for a number of Belgian clubs like La Louviére and  Mons, as well as amateur clubs KAV Dendermonde and SK Lombeek.

Managerial career
Amrouche began his managerial career in 1988 by coaching the youth ranks of local club OMR El Annasser while playing for the senior team. He held the same role during his playing stints with USM Alger and RC Kouba.

In 2002, he was appointed as the manager of Congolese club Daring Club Motema Pembe.

In 2007, Amrouche became the coach of the Burundi national football team. On 1 January 2011, Amrouche turned down an offer to take over the vacant managerial role of Algerian club ES Sétif, preferring to continue in his role with the Burundi national team. On 29 February 2012, Amrouche resigned as the manager of Burundi, just a day after a 2–1 win against Zimbabwe in the 2013 Africa Cup of Nations qualifiers.

In February 2013, Amrouche was named coach of the Kenya national football team taking over the position from James Nandwa who was there on temporary basis after the departure of Henri Michel. After 18 months at the helm, he was sacked on 3 August 2014 following Kenya's 1–0 aggregate loss to Lesotho in the second round of qualification for the 2015 Africa Cup of Nations.

He managed USM Alger in 2016.

He became manager of the Libyan national team in May 2018. He resigned from the position in October 2018.

He then managed MC Alger.

In August 2019 he became manager of Botswana.

References

External links
 Official website
 Adel Amrouche at Footballdatabase

1968 births
Living people
People from Kouba
Footballers from Algiers
Algerian footballers
Association football midfielders
CR Belouizdad players
JS Kabylie players
OMR El Annasser players
USM Alger players
Favoritner AC players
Olympique de Médéa players
AS Aïn M'lila players
R.A.A. Louviéroise players
R.A.E.C. Mons players
Algerian Ligue 2 players
2. Liga (Austria) players
Challenger Pro League players
Competitors at the 1991 Mediterranean Games
Mediterranean Games competitors for Algeria
Algerian expatriate footballers
Algerian expatriate sportspeople in Austria
Algerian expatriate sportspeople in Belgium
Expatriate footballers in Austria
Expatriate footballers in Belgium
Algerian football managers

Equatorial Guinea national football team managers

Burundi national football team managers
Kenya national football team managers
USM Alger managers
Libya national football team managers
MC Alger managers
Botswana national football team managers

Algerian Ligue Professionnelle 1 managers
Algerian expatriate football managers
Algerian expatriate sportspeople in the Democratic Republic of the Congo
Algerian expatriate sportspeople in Equatorial Guinea
Algerian expatriate sportspeople in Ukraine
Algerian expatriate sportspeople in Azerbaijan
Algerian expatriate sportspeople in Burundi
Algerian expatriate sportspeople in Kenya
Algerian expatriate sportspeople in Libya
Algerian expatriate sportspeople in Botswana
Expatriate football managers in the Democratic Republic of the Congo
Expatriate football managers in Equatorial Guinea
Expatriate football managers in Azerbaijan
Expatriate football managers in Burundi
Expatriate football managers in Kenya
Expatriate football managers in Libya
Expatriate football managers in Botswana
21st-century Algerian people